Leave the World Behind is an upcoming  psychological thriller film written, directed and produced by Sam Esmail, based on the 2020 the novel of the same name by Rumaan Alam. The film stars Julia Roberts (who also co-produced the film), Mahershala Ali, Ethan Hawke, Myha'la Herrold, Farrah Mackenzie, Charlie Evans, and Kevin Bacon.

Premise

Cast
 Julia Roberts as Amanda
 Mahershala Ali as George "G.H." Washington
 Ethan Hawke as Clay
 Myha'la Herrold as Ruth Washington
 Farrah Mackenzie as Rosie
 Charlie Evans as Archie
 Kevin Bacon as Danny

Production
Netflix won a bidding war for the rights to the novel in July 2020, with Sam Esmail directing and writing the film. Julia Roberts and Denzel Washington were set to star in and produce the film.

In September 2021, Mahershala Ali had been cast in the film, replacing Washington who had exited by that point. Ethan Hawke and Myha'la Herrold would join in January 2022.

Filming began in April 2022 on Long Island. There was additional filming in Katonah, New York on May 19, 2022.

Release
Leave the World Behind will be released by Netflix on December 8, 2023.

References

External links

Upcoming films
English-language Netflix original films
Upcoming Netflix original films
Bangladeshi-American culture
Films set in Long Island
Films shot in New York (state)
Films based on American novels
Higher Ground Productions films
American drama films